Papilio (Chilasa) agestor, the tawny mime, is a swallowtail butterfly, native to Indian subcontinent and widely found across Asia. The butterfly belongs to the mime subgenus, Chilasa, of the genus Papilio or the black-bodied swallowtails.

Description

Upperside: forewing black with the following bluish-grey markings: a very slender line along costal margin, a broad streak from base in cell that does not reach the apex of the same, two spots on the black area at apex, a long streak in interspace la; two elongate broad streaks in interspace 1 divided by a slender black ill-defined line; broad rectangular streaks in interspaces 2, 3, 4 and 6; a narrower inwardly obsolescent streak in interspace 5, and elongate spots in interspaces 8, 9, and 10; the streaks in interspaces 1 to 4 crossed transversely near their apices by a line of the ground colour; finally a complete subterminal series of small whitish spots. Hindwing rich chestnut red; cell filled by a trifid bluish - grey streak, followed at the bases of interspaces 2 to 6 by elougate bluish-grey spots; a narrow streak of the same colour from base in interspace 1; a postdiscal series of spots in interspaces 5, 6 and 7 and a more or less obsolescent subterminal series of dots also bluish grey; the veins on the wing conspicuously paler than the ground colour. Underside: forewing similar to the upperside except that the ground colour on the apical area is dull brown not black. Hindwing also as the upperside, but the ground colour on the disc of the wing of a darker deeper shade of chestnut; the postdiscal series of spots more or less obscurely complete from interspace 1 to 7; and the subterminal series of spots of the upperside formed into lunules. Antennae, head, thorax and abdomen black, the head and thorax variegated with bluish-grey spots, the abdomen with lateral transverse bars.

Race govindra, Moore very closely resembles the typical form but can always be distinguished by the presence of a complete series of postdiscal bluish-grey spots on the upperside of the hindwing. It is generally also smaller in both sexes than typical agestor, and on the upperside of the hindwing the ground colour in the anterior interspaces is broadly centred along the middle with very dark brown, almost black. The female frequently has the ground colour of the hindwing a much brighter chestnut (almost ochraceous) than in any specimen of female of agestor that the describer had seen.

Distribution
The butterfly is found in Pakistan from west Kashmir to Sikkim and right across from Assam to Myanmar (including Nepal, Bhutan and Bangladesh), Thailand, Vietnam, Laos, Kampuchea, central and southern China and peninsular Malaysia.

Status
It is never common but is not known to be threatened across most of its range. Extremely local. Considered to be vulnerable in Peninsular Malaysia.

Habitat

Mimicry
This butterfly may mimic the chestnut tiger butterfly (Parantica sita).

Habits
It is known to patrol a beat and respond aggressively to passing butterflies and insects for long periods in a locality. It does not visit flowers.

Life cycle
It is single brooded and generally appears in March in Himachal Pradesh.

"The female lays her eggs on the young leaves of Machilus odorattisimus trees, Natural Order Lauraceae, about the end of April. The larva is at first of a reddish colour but very soon turns black and white, and lies on the upper surface of a leaf where it greatly and protectively resembles a bird's droppings."

Adult larva: brown with two subdorsal and two lateral rows of fleshy-pointed tubercles, each with a spot of red at its base; anterior, middle and posterior lateral patches of dull ochraceous, the latter two meeting on the dorsum; the rest of the larva spotted with black and red."

Pupa dark brown with lines of dull ochraceous, roughened, with the anal end truncate." (Described from plate to Mackinnon & de Niceville's paper.)

Subspecies
Papilio agestor agestor Gray, 1831
Papilio agestor govindra Moore, 1864
Papilio agestor matsumurae Fruhstorfer
Papilio agestor restricta Leech, 1893
Papilio agestor shirozui (Igarashi, 1979)
Papilio agestor kuangtungensis (Mell, 1935)

See also
Papilionidae
List of butterflies of India
List of butterflies of India (Papilionidae)

References

Other reading
 
 
 
 
 
 

agestor
Chilasa
Insects of Pakistan
Butterflies of Indochina
Taxa named by John Edward Gray
Butterflies described in 1831